Ptghunk (also Romanized as Ptghunk’, Ptghounq, and Ptkhunk) is a village in the Armenian province of Armavir. The village is about 10 miles from Yerevan on the road to Komitas, and is close to the Zvartnots airport. The population of Ptghunk is about 1,400.

See also 
Armavir Province

References 

World Gazeteer: Armenia – World-Gazetteer.com

Populated places in Armavir Province